Sir Nicholas Hare of Bruisyard, Suffolk (c. 1484 – 31 October 1557) was Speaker of the House of Commons of England between 1539 and 1540.

Life
He was born the eldest son of John Hare of Homersfield, Suffolk, educated at Gonville and Caius College, Cambridge and admitted to the Inner Temple in 1515. He had three sisters, who were married to MPs, and a brother, John Hare of Stow Bardolph, Norfolk.

He was MP for Downton, Wiltshire in 1529 and possibly Wiltshire in 1539 (when he was elected Speaker of the House of Commons), Lancaster in 1545 and Taunton in 1547. In 1539 the nunnery of Bruisyard was dissolved and assigned by Henry VIII to Sir Nicholas. He was knighted in May 1539 and eventually became Master of the Rolls (1553–1557).

In 1554 he presided at the trial of Sir Nicholas Throckmorton, who had been accused of involvement in Wyatt's rebellion against the marriage of Queen Mary to Felipe of Spain.

Sir Nicholas died in Chancery Lane in 1557 and was buried in nearby Temple Church, commemorated in the south bay window of the new Inner Temple Hall.

Family
Hare married Catherine, daughter and coheiress of Sir John Bassingbourne of Woodhall near Hatfield, Hertfordshire. They had three sons and three daughters. The second son was Robert Hare the antiquary.

References

History of Parliament Hare, Nicholas (by 1495–1557) of Bruisyard, Suffolk

1480s births
1557 deaths
Speakers of the House of Commons of England
Masters of the Rolls
Alumni of Gonville and Caius College, Cambridge
Year of birth uncertain
English MPs 1529–1536
English MPs 1539–1540
English MPs 1545–1547
English MPs 1547–1552